Alice Anderson (born 1966) is an American poet. She is particularly known for her collection, Human Nature.

Biography
Alice Anderson was born May 20, 1966 in Tulsa, Oklahoma. She spent her childhood in California and Mississippi. Anderson's work deals with issues that have impacted her life: family violence, intimate partner violence, and traumatic brain injury.  

Anderson was living in Ocean Springs, Mississippi when Hurricane Katrina hit.

Anderson took a classes at California State University, Sacramento, receiving a BA in English. As an undergrad Anderson worked with the poet Dennis Schmitz who encouraged her to go to graduate school.  

She received an MFA in Poetry from Sarah Lawrence College.

Anderson's, multi-genre, oeuvre explores using language to reveal universal illuminations that arise from suffering.

Awards
 1994 Elmer Holmes Bobst Award for Emerging Writers

 1994 Sarah Lawrence Poetry Prize

Works
 Some Bright Morning, I'll Fly Away: A Memoir (St. Martin's Press, 2017)
 The Watermark (Eyewear Publishing, 2016)
 Human Nature (NYU Press, 1994)

References

External links
The Reading Life With Alice Anderson on New Orleans Public Radio

21st-century American poets
20th-century American poets
21st-century American women writers
20th-century American women writers
American women poets
Writers from Tulsa, Oklahoma
Poets from Oklahoma
1966 births
Living people
Sarah Lawrence College alumni
California State University, Sacramento alumni